Metisella kakamega, the Kakamega sylph, is a butterfly in the family Hesperiidae. It was described by de Jong in 1976. It is found in western Kenya.

References

Butterflies described in 1976
Heteropterinae